Primăverii neighborhood (“Springtime”) is a district situated in the north of Bucharest, the capital of Romania, in Sector 1. The area is one of the most expensive in the city and is home to many politicians and local celebrities.

History
The district is relatively new and was built on the old "Grădina Bordei" park which was situated on the outskirts of the city at the beginning of the 20th century. The park was given as a wedding present to his daughter Caliopi by Constantin Hrisoscoleu, when she married Petrache Poenaru. The domain was later bought by King Carol II of Romania.

The houses of the district were built in the 1930s as inexpensive semi-detached houses by architect Octav Doicescu.  After World War II, most members of the Central Committee of the Romanian Communist Party moved to the area, with the largest houses on Primăverii boulevard being inhabited by the members of the Politburo. These houses, which had large gardens in the back, were surrounded by tall walls and heavily guarded by the Romanian police at the time, called “Miliția”.

Starting with the 1960s, the nomenklatura began building large mansions, with many rooms, parks, and swimming pools. For instance, Alexandru Drăghici built a villa on the banks of Lake Herăstrău, which, after Drăghici fell out of favour with the leaders, was later converted into the Primăverii Palace and used for heads of state guests. Nicolae Ceaușescu occupied a whole block of villas, including one for his security guards and one for domestic servants.

Primăverii has remained an exclusive district since then.

Transportation
The district is served by the Aviatorilor metro station and by various STB buses.

References

External links
 

Districts of Bucharest